Lotfollah Yarmohammadi (1933-2021) was an Iranian linguist and emeritus professor of linguistics at Shiraz University. He is known for his expertise on discourse analysis. Yarmohammadi is a permanent member of the Academy of Sciences of Iran.

Books
Introduction to Phonetics, Tehran: Iran University Press
Basic Persian for speakers of other languages, Shiraz: Navid Shiraz

References

1933 births
Living people
Linguists from Iran
Phoneticians
English–Persian translators
Grammarians of Persian
Linguists of Persian
Iranian grammarians
Indiana University alumni
Academic staff of Shiraz University
Academy of Sciences of Iran members